NELF may refer to:

 Nasal embryonic LHRH factor, a protein encoded by the NELF gene
 Near East Land Forces, a former part of the British Near East Command
 Negative elongation factor, a protein complex
 Nelf (sexting) or nelfie, an explicit selfie
 New England Legal Foundation
 New European Left Forum; see Party of the European Left